Sredneakhtubinsky District is an administrative district (raion), one of the thirty-three in Volgograd Oblast, Russia. As a municipal division, it is incorporated as Sredneakhtubinsky Municipal District. It is located in the southeast of the oblast. Its administrative center is the urban locality (a work settlement) of Srednyaya Akhtuba. Population:  55,341 (2002 Census);  The population of Srednyaya Akhtuba accounts for 24.5% of the district's total population.

Administrative and municipal divisions
As an administrative division, the district is divided into one town of district significance (Krasnoslobodsk), one urban-type settlement (Srednyaya Akhtuba), and nine selsoviets. As a municipal division, the district is incorporated as Sredneakhtubinsky Municipal District and is divided into two urban and ten rural settlements. Until April 2012, the municipal district included all of the inhabited localities of the administrative district, with the exception of one rural locality (the settlement of Uralsky), which was municipally a part of Volzhsky Urban Okrug. In April 2012, the settlement of Uralsky was merged into the city of Volzhsky.

References

Notes

Sources

Districts of Volgograd Oblast
